The 2015–16 Notre Dame Fighting Irish men's basketball team represented the University of Notre Dame during the 2015–16 NCAA Division I men's basketball season. The Fighting Irish, led by sixteenth year head coach Mike Brey, played its home games at Edmund P. Joyce Center in South Bend, Indiana and were third year members of the Atlantic Coast Conference. They finished the season 24–12, 11–7 in ACC play to finish in a tie for fifth place. They defeated Duke in the quarterfinals of the ACC tournament to advance to the semifinals where they lost to North Carolina. They received an at-large bid to the NCAA tournament where they defeated Michigan, Stephen F. Austin, and Wisconsin to advance to the Elite Eight where they lost to fellow ACC member North Carolina.

Previous season
The Fighting Irish finished the season 32–6, 14–4 in ACC play to finish in third place. They defeated Miami (FL), Duke, and North Carolina to become champions of the ACC tournament. They received an automatic bid to the NCAA tournament where they defeated Northeastern in the second round, Butler in the third round, and Wichita State in the Sweet Sixteen before losing in the Elite Eight to unbeaten Kentucky in a close game, 68–66.

Offseason

Departures

2015 recruiting class

2016 Recruiting class

Roster

Schedule and results

|-
!colspan=12 style="background:#002649; color:white;"| Exhibition

|-
!colspan=12 style="background:#002649; color:white;"| Non-conference regular season

|-
!colspan=12 style="background:#002649; color:white;"| ACC Regular season

|-
!colspan=12 style="background:#002649; color:white;"| ACC Tournament

|-
!colspan=12 style="background:#002649; color:white;"| NCAA tournament

Rankings

References

Notre Dame Fighting Irish men's basketball seasons
Notre Dame
Notre Dame Fighting Irish men's basketball
Notre Dame Fighting Irish men's basketball
Notre Dame